Neepsend power station supplied electricity to the City of Sheffield and the surrounding area from 1910 to 1976. The power station was owned and operated by the Sheffield Corporation Electricity Department prior to the nationalisation of the British electricity supply industry in 1948. It was operated in conjunction with Blackburn Meadows and Kelham power stations and was closed in 1976.

History
The Neepsend power station was built at Owlerton (53°24’19”N, 1°29’08”W). The site was between the River Don and the Great Central Railway which provided water for cooling and access from the railway for the supply of coal. The station first supplied electricity in 1910. Further equipment was added in 1914 to meet the rising demand for electricity. Demand increased again during the First World War; by 1923 the station had a generating capacity of 65,000 kW. The station operated in conjunction with Blackburn Meadows (28,000 kW in 1923) and Kelham (5,500 kW in 1923) power stations, the latter provided electric current for the tram system. During the 1920s and 1930s there was only slow growth in electricity demand until the rearmament  boom in the late 1930s when Neepsend and Blackburn Meadows power stations had further generating  plant installed.

The British electricity supply industry was nationalised in 1948 under the provisions of the Electricity Act 1947 (10 & 11 Geo. 6 c. 54). The Sheffield electricity undertaking was abolished, ownership of Neepsend power station was vested in the British Electricity Authority, and subsequently the Central Electricity Authority and the Central Electricity Generating Board (CEGB). At the same time the electricity distribution and sales responsibilities of the Sheffield electricity undertaking were transferred to the Yorkshire Electricity Board (YEB).

Further new generating plant was installed at Neepsend in 1948–50.

Neepsend power station was closed on 25 October 1976.

Equipment specification

Plant in 1914
The plant installed in 1914 included a 10,500 kW Willans and Robinson steam turbine and Diek Kerr alternator. The boilers were Stirling water-tube type each capable of evaporating 4,800 gallons an hour (21.8 m3/h). There were two cooling towers each cooled 330,000 gallons an hour (1500  m3/h).

Plant in 1923
By 1923 the plant comprised boilers delivering 1,240,000 lb/h (156.2 kg/s) of steam to:

3 × 2,000 kW steam turbo-alternators, alternating current (AC)

1 × 6,000 kW steam turbo-alternator AC

4 × 8,500 kW steam turbo-alternators AC

1 × 9,000 kW steam turbo-alternators AC

1 × 10,000 kW steam turbo-alternators AC

These machines gave a total generating capacity of 65,000 kW alternating current (AC).

Plant in 1954
By 1954 the plant comprised:

 Boilers:
 5 × Stirling 160,000 lb/h (20.16 kg/s) tri-drum boilers  
 3 × Stirling 190,000 lb/h (23.9 kg/s) tri-drum boilers
 3 × Mitchell 190,000 lb/h (23.9 kg/s) boiler

Steam conditions were 625 psi and 850°F (43.1 bar and 454°C).

There was a total steam raising capability of 835,000 lb/h (105.2 kg/s); steam was supplied to:

 Generators:
 2 × 30 MW British Thomson-Houston turbo-alternators, 3,000 rpm, 11.4 kV (installed 1936 and 1937)
 2 × 50 MW Metropolitan Vickers two cylinder turbo-alternator, 1,500 rpm, 11.4 kV (installed 1948 and 1950)

The total generating capacity from 1950 was 160 MW at 11.4 kV.

There were three Mitchell cooling towers, each with a capacity of 10.5 million gallons per hour (13.26 m3/s).

Operating data
Operating data for the period 1946–72 was:

Neepsend power station was closed on 25 October 1976.

See also
 Timeline of the UK electricity supply industry
 List of power stations in England
 Blackburn Meadows power station

References

Demolished power stations in the United Kingdom
Coal-fired power stations in England